The Together class is a series of 5 container ships built for Danaos Corporation and operated by HMM. The ships have a maximum theoretical capacity of 13,082 TEU. The ships were built by Hyundai Samho Heavy Industries in South Korea.

List of ships

See also 

 HMM Algeciras-class container ship
 HMM Nuri-class container ship
 Hyundai Dream-class container ship
 Hyundai Earth-class container ship

References 

Container ship classes
Ships built by Hyundai Heavy Industries Group